Bouloussou Soubramaniom Sastroulou (Bulusu Subrahmaṇya Śāstrulu; 1866 – 13 September 1941) was Diwan, Conseiller local and Judge Advocate during French colonial rule in Yanam in the early 20th century.

Birth
Soubramaniom Sastroulou was born in Yanam in 1866 and was raised by his maternal grandmother, Veerubhotla Mahalakshmamma  (వీరుభొట్ల మహలక్ష్మమ్మ Vīrubhoţla Mahalakṣhmamma). He was born to Bouloussou Zagannadha Sastroulou (జగన్నాథశాస్త్రులు Jagannāthaśāstrulu) through his second wife, Boulousou Vincatanarasamma (వెంకటనరసమ్మ Věnkaţanarsamma). He was third one among seven sons. Later, he was a prominent personality in Yanam during French rule in the early 20th century.

Early life
He worked as Diwan for Manyam Zamindar for many years before entering politics. Manyam Mahalakshmamma, then Zamindarni quotes about him in her interview in 1902 with Vadivelu that was mentioned in his book,

He later went on to become a landlord in Yanam and his popularity later paved way for his plunge into Yanam politics. His prominence can be understood from the incident of his request to obtain authorization to elect 2 members of Administration of committee of Vishnu and Siva Temples, replacing late Counomreddy Kroustama and Marla-Pérousomayazoulou was accepted by Clement-Thomas, then Governor-General of French India on 21 September 1894.

Political career
Sastroulou got elected to Conseil Local de Yanaon in 1928 from 'Bapanaya-Samatam party' and served until 1934. He was one of Bezawada Bapa Naidou's  four Councillors in that council between 1928 and 1931 and later on under Kamichetty Venugopala Rao Naidou for the rest. He had been one of the Judge Advocate (Assesseur appelés) for the criminal court of Yanaon. After murder of Bapanaya Naidou few years later, Sastroulou stepped away from politics permanently.

Personal life
He was married to Bouloussou Souryapracassamma (సూర్యప్రకాశమ్మ Sūryaprakāśamma), daughter of Kala Latchminarayana and Kala Sodemma of Nadipudi village near Narasapur in West Godavari district. She is sister of former minister of Madras and Andhra Pradesh, Kala Venkata Rao. The couple had three sons namely, Bulusu Jaganadha Sastry, Bulusu Lakshminarayana Murthy and Bulusu Satyanarayana Murty. Eldest son B. J. Sastry was a prominent engineer and was among one the earliest life members of the Indian Science Congress Association (ISCA). Sastroulou is co-brother of Sripada Krishnamurty Sastry, the first poet laureate of Andhra Pradesh through his wife Sripada Venkata Ratnamba (née Kala).

Death
Sastroulou died at his ancestral house at Yanaon, situated in ruelle de Zalidinquy (Jaladanki street), Yanaon on 13 September 1941.

Titles held
 Diwan of Manyam Zamindari of Yanaon under Maniom Mahalatchamamma, from 1888 to 1941
 Judge Advocate (Assesseur) for Criminal Court of Yanaon during 1917, 1918, 1919, 1920 and 1934

Offices held

See also
 Telugu people
 Municipal Administration in French India

References

1874 births
French Hindus
French India
People from Yanam district
Telugu politicians
1941 deaths
French people of Telugu descent
People from Yanam
Telugu people
People of French India
Bouloussou family